The 8th César Awards ceremony, presented by the Académie des Arts et Techniques du Cinéma, honoured the best French films of 1982 and took place on 26 February 1983 at Le Grand Rex in Paris. The ceremony was chaired by Catherine Deneuve and hosted by Jean-Claude Brialy. La Balance won the award for Best Film.

Winners and nominees
The winners are highlighted in bold:

Best Film:La Balance, directed by Bob SwaimDanton, directed by Andrzej WajdaPassion, directed by Jean-Luc GodardUne chambre en ville, directed by Jacques Demy
Best Foreign Film:Victor Victoria, directed by Blake EdwardsE.T. the Extra-Terrestrial, directed by Steven SpielbergThe French Lieutenant's Woman, directed by Karel ReiszYol, directed by Serif Gören, Yılmaz Güney
Best First Work:Mourir à trente ans, directed by Romain GoupilJosepha, directed by Christopher FrankLettres d'amour en Somalie, directed by Frédéric MitterrandTir groupé, directed by Jean-Claude Missiaen
Best Actor:Philippe Léotard, for La BalanceGérard Depardieu, for DantonLino Ventura, for Les MisérablesGérard Lanvin, for Tir groupé
Best Actress:Nathalie Baye, for La BalanceMiou-Miou, for JosephaRomy Schneider, for La Passante du Sans-SouciSimone Signoret, for L'Étoile du Nord
Best Supporting Actor:Jean Carmet, for Les MisérablesGérard Klein, for La Passante du Sans-SouciMichel Jonasz, for Qu'est-ce qui fait courir David?Jean-François Stévenin, for Une chambre en ville
Best Supporting Actress:Fanny Cottençon, for L'Étoile du NordDenise Grey, for La Boum 2Stéphane Audran, for Paradis pour tousDanielle Darrieux, for Une chambre en ville
Most Promising Actor:Christophe Malavoy, for Family RockJean-Paul Comart, for La BalanceTchéky Karyo, for La BalanceDominique Pinon, for The Return of Martin Guerre
Most Promising Actress:Sophie Marceau, for La Boum 2Souad Amidou, for Le Grand frèreFabienne Guyon, for Une chambre en villeJulie Jézéquel, for L'Étoile du Nord  
Best Director:Andrzej Wajda, for DantonBob Swaim, for La BalanceJean-Luc Godard, for PassionJacques Demy, for Une chambre en ville  
Best Writing - Original:Jean-Claude Carrière, Daniel Vigne, for The Return of Martin GuerreMathieu Fabiani, Bob Swaim, for La BalanceÉric Rohmer, for Le Beau MariageÉlie Chouraqui, for Qu'est-ce qui fait courir David?
Best Writing - Adaptation:Jean Aurenche, Michel Grisolia, Pierre Granier-Deferre, for L'Étoile du NordJean-Claude Carrière, for DantonDaniel Schmid, Pascal Jardin, for HécateRobert Hossein, Alain Decaux, for Les Misérables 
Best Cinematography:Henri Alekan, for La TruiteEdmond Richard, for Les MisérablesRaoul Coutard, for PassionJean Penzer, for Une chambre en ville
Best Sound:William Robert Sivel, Claude Villand, for La Passante du Sans-SouciPiotr Zawadzki, Dominique Hennequin, Jean-Pierre Ruh, for DantonPierre Gamet, Jacques Maumont, for Les Quarantièmes rugissantsGérard Lamps, André Hervée, for Une chambre en ville
Best Editing:Noëlle Boisson, for Qu'est-ce qui fait courir David?Françoise Javet, for La BalanceHenri Lanoë, for Les Quarantièmes rugissantsArmand Psenny, for Tir groupéJean Ravel, for L'Étoile du Nord  
Best Music:Michel Portal, for The Return of Martin GuerreVladimir Cosma, for La Boum 2Georges Delerue, for La Passante du Sans-SouciMichel Colombier, for Une chambre en ville
Best Production Design:Alain Nègre, for The Return of Martin GuerreFrançois de Lamothe, for Les MisérablesAlexandre Trauner, for La TruiteBernard Evein, for Une chambre en ville
Best Animated Short:La Légende du pauvre bossu, directed by Michel OcelotChronique 1909, directed by Paul Brizzi, Gaëtan BrizziSans préavis, directed by Michel Gauthier 
Best Fiction Short:Bluff, directed by Philippe BensoussanCorre, gitano, directed by Tony GatlifMerlin ou le cours de l'or, directed by Arthur JofféLa Saisie, directed by Yves-Noël François
Best Documentary Short:Junkopia, directed by Chris MarkerL'Ange de l'abîme, directed by Annie TresgotLos Montes, directed by José Martin SarmientoSculptures sonores, directed by Jacques Barsac

See also
 55th Academy Awards
 36th British Academy Film Awards

References

External links
 Official website
 
 8th César Awards at AlloCiné

1983
1983 film awards
Cesar